Hume Historic District is a national historic district located at Hume, Fauquier County, Virginia.  It encompasses 59 contributing buildings in the rural village of Hume.  The majority of the buildings in the district are vernacular in nature and are late-19th- to early- 20th-century frame dwellings of the side-passage and I-house form. It also contains three commercial buildings, a church, two schools, and a former tavern.  Notable buildings include Barbee's Tavern (c. 1787), "The Dell," the parsonage for Leeds Church (c. 1855), former Captain Marshall's Store (c. 1860), the African-American Hume School (c. 1906), the former Hume Methodist Church (c. 1900), and the Hume Baptist Church (1921).

It was listed on the National Register of Historic Places in 2008.

References

Historic districts in Fauquier County, Virginia
National Register of Historic Places in Fauquier County, Virginia
Historic districts on the National Register of Historic Places in Virginia